Castle Gate is an historic street in the centre of the city of Nottingham between Lister Gate and Castle Road.

History
The early name for the street was Frenchgate, or Franchegate.

Paving works were undertaken in 1752 at a cost of £60.

The street is noted for its Georgian houses, many of which are listed. The street was bisected in 1958 by the construction of Maid Marian Way, resulting in the loss of several fine properties, including number 35, St Nicholas Rectory of 1886 by Watson Fothergill and number 37 which was St Nicholas’ Parish Rooms.

Notable buildings

4, Castle Gate Congregational Chapel
6, Cleaves Hall, 1883 by Parry and Walker. Built as Castle Gate Schools by the Congregational Chapel
10, 12 and 12a former Lace Factory
11, Formerly the Black Lion Inn (demolished)
15, Former Warehouse and Bakery 1897 by William Dymock Pratt
17, Town House
19 Stanford House ca. 1776
24 to 30, Castlegate House, formerly a Ministry of Transport Office
27 St Nicholas Court, 1900 by H.E. Woodsend
29 and 31, Town Houses 1794 Later an Inland Revenue Office. From 24 September 1875 until 1930 the Nottingham Hospital for Women.
32 Castlegate Chambers
33 House, formerly Lyceum House
34 and 36 Town House
43, 45 and 47 House 1788 by William Stretton. Formerly the offices of the Nottingham City Architects' office 1960s - 1974, then the Nottingham Costume Museum until 2004.
49, House
50a Royal Children Public House 1933-34 by Albert Edgar Eberlin
51, House ca. 1700
53, House ca. 1700
55, House
57 and 59, 2 Houses
64 Newdigate House ca. 1675 Built by Thomas Charlton of Chilwell. This was the house in which Camille d'Hostun, duc de Tallard was kept prisoner from 1705 to 1711 after defeat in the Battle of Blenheim in 1704.

References

Buildings and structures in Nottingham
Streets in Nottingham